The 2010 ASA Kwik-Trip Midwest Tour presented by Echo Outdoor Power Equipment and grandstay.net was the fourth season of the American Speed Association's Midwest Tour.  The championship was held over 11 races, beginning May 2 in Oregon, Wisconsin, and ending October 10 in West Salem, Wisconsin.  Steve Carlson was the champion.

Schedule and results

Championship points

References

Asa Midwest Tour
ASA Midwest Tour seasons